Havre Saint-Pierre Airport  is located  north of Havre-Saint-Pierre, Quebec, Canada. It serves Labrador, the lower and central North Shore and southern Quebec, including Anticosti Island.

There is a single asphalt runway and a terminal building, built in 1983, that handle scheduled flights and air charters.

The airport is owned by Transport Canada and operated by Aeropro.

Airlines and destinations

See also
 Havre Saint-Pierre Water Aerodrome

References

External links

Certified airports in Côte-Nord